is a Japanese musical actor and singer. Ishimaru is signed to Sony Music Entertainment Japan. He grew up in Ichihara, Chiba and graduated from Tokyo University of the Arts.

Biography
Ishimaru played various instruments, such as the piano, cello, trombone, and snare drum, since childhood. He studied the cello at a music course at Chiba Prefectural Makuhari-Nishin High School (now Chiba Prefectural Makuhari General High School), attempted to major in the saxophone at Tokyo College of Music, and graduated from the Tokyo University of the Arts Faculty of Music in Vocal music.

In 1990, he debuted in the role of Raoul of Shiki Theatre Company's The Phantom of the Opera. Since then, Ishimaru has acted as a signboard actor for the company. Among other activities, he appeared in advertisements for Oronamin C (co-starring with SMAP's Takuya Kimura) and Nescafé Gold Blend. In 2013, he played branch manager Tadasu Asano in the Tokyo Broadcasting System television drama Hanzawa Naoki.  On 2 April 2017, he was named the sixth chairperson of TV Asahi's long-running music programme Daimei no nai Ongakukai.

Filmography

Stage

Part of Shiki

After leaving Shiki

Films

Television

Animation

Dubbing

Advertisements

Radio

MC-Navigator

CD

Music guides

Others

References

External links
  
  
  

Japanese male musical theatre actors
Japanese male voice actors
Tokyo University of the Arts alumni
Actors from Ehime Prefecture
Male voice actors from Ehime Prefecture
1965 births
Living people